The 1980 Baltimore Orioles season was the club's 27th season in Baltimore. It involved the Orioles finishing 2nd in the American League East with a record of 100 wins and 62 losses.

Offseason 
 December 6, 1979: John Flinn was traded by the Orioles to the Milwaukee Brewers for Lenn Sakata.

Spring training 
The Orioles played two spring training exhibition games at the Louisiana Superdome against the New York Yankees over the weekend of March 15 and 16, 1980. 45,152 spectators watched the Yankees beat the Orioles 9 to 3 on March 15, 1980. The following day, 43,339 fans saw Floyd Rayford lead the Orioles to a 7 to 1 win over the Yankees.

Regular season 
During the season, Steve Stone became the last pitcher to win at least 25 games for the Orioles in the 20th century.

Season standings

Record vs. opponents

Notable transactions 
 April 3, 1980: Billy Smith was released by the Orioles.
 April 5, 1980: Steve Luebber was signed as a free agent by the Orioles.
 April 21, 1980: Paul Hartzell was signed as a free agent by the Orioles.
 May 13, 1980: Dave Skaggs was purchased from the Orioles by the California Angels.
 June 3, 1980: 1980 Major League Baseball Draft
Carl Nichols was drafted by the Orioles in the 4th round.
Mark Brown was drafted by the Orioles in the 6th round.
Ricky Jones was drafted by the Orioles in the 15th round.

Roster

Player stats

Batting

Starters by position 
Note: Pos = Position; G = Games played; AB = At bats; H = Hits; Avg. = Batting average; HR = Home runs; RBI = Runs batted in

Other batters 
Note: G = Games played; AB = At bats; H = Hits; Avg. = Batting average; HR = Home runs; RBI = Runs batted in

Pitching

Starting pitchers 
Note: G = Games pitched; IP = Innings pitched; W = Wins; L = Losses; ERA = Earned run average; SO = Strikeouts

Other pitchers 
Note: G = Games pitched; IP = Innings pitched; W = Wins; L = Losses; ERA = Earned run average; SO = Strikeouts

Relief pitchers 
Note: G = Games pitched; W = Wins; L = Losses; SV = Saves; ERA = Earned run average; SO = Strikeouts

Farm system 

LEAGUE CHAMPIONS: Charlotte

Notes

References 

1980 Baltimore Orioles team page at Baseball Reference
1980 Baltimore Orioles season at baseball-almanac.com

Baltimore Orioles seasons
Baltimore Orioles season
Baltimore Orioles